Stjepanović is a South Slavic patronymic surname derived from a masculine given name Stjepan. Notable people bearing this surname:
Boro Stjepanović (born 1946), actor
Nemanja Stjepanović (born 1984), footballer
Ostoja Stjepanović (born 1985), footballer
Slaven Stjepanović (born 1987), footballer
Velimir Stjepanović (born 1993), swimmer
Zoran Stjepanović (born 1975), footballer

Croatian surnames
Serbian surnames
Patronymic surnames
Surnames from given names